Un ragazzo di Calabria (internationally released as A Boy from Calabria) is a 1987 Italian comedy drama film by Luigi Comencini.

It entered the main competition at the 44th Venice Film Festival in which it won the Pasinetti Award for Best Actor (to Gian Maria Volonté).

Cast 
Gian Maria Volonté as Felice
Diego Abatantuono as  Nicola
Thérèse Liotard as  Mariuccia
Santo Polimeno as  Mimì

References

External links

1987 films
1987 comedy-drama films
Films directed by Luigi Comencini
Films set in 1960
Running films
Social realism in film
Films set in Calabria
Films with screenplays by Ugo Pirro
1987 comedy films
1987 drama films
Italian comedy-drama films
1980s Italian-language films
1980s Italian films